Charles Collingwood Roberts (6 July 1900 – 17 May 1980) was a British entrepreneur. He was a former Chairman of the Butterfield & Swire and an unofficial member of the Legislative Council of Hong Kong.

Biography
Roberts joined Butterfield and Swire in October 1922, responsible for sugar traveling from Shanghai from 1925-1926, shore management for China Navigation Company in Hankow from 1926–28, and responsible for Chinese Staff Shanghai from 1932-34. On 1 October 1932, Roberts married to Constance May Mitchell at the St. John's Cathedral.

During the Japanese occupation of Hong Kong, he was among many other British local figures who were held at the Block 8 of the St. Stephen College and participated in the camp councils.

After the war, Roberts became the first chairman of the Cathay Pacific Airways, the airline which was acquired by Butterfield & Swire and its associated shipping interests in 1948. At that time, he co-founded the Hong Kong Aircraft Engineering Company with David F. Landale, taipan of the Jardine Matheson and founder of the Hong Kong Airways in 1950.

In 1948 and 1950, he was the chairman of the Hong Kong General Chamber of Commerce. After the resignation of R. D. Gillespie, he was elected by the chamber to be the representative on the Legislative Council of Hong Kong on 6 May, until he stepped down in August and was replaced by P. S. Cassidy.

He was also deputy chairman of the Hongkong and Shanghai Banking Corporation in 1940-41 and director of the bank.

References

1900 births
1980 deaths
20th-century British businesspeople
British expatriates in China
British expatriates in Hong Kong
Hong Kong businesspeople
Cathay Pacific
Swire Group
HSBC people
Members of the Legislative Council of Hong Kong